Berry Leroy Powel (born 2 May 1980) is a Dutch former professional footballer who played as a forward. He works as a scout for De Graafschap.

Career
Powel started playing at AFC Quick 1890 and succeeded at the non-professional club Roda '46. Powel was discovered by FC Den Bosch, and in 2003 he made his debut for the club's first team. In his first season at the club, he scored 9 goals in 26 games for Den Bosch, when they played in the Eerste Divisie. Powel became champions with his club and FC Den Bosch promoted to the Eredivisie. In the Eredivisie he scored two goals in 29 games. Den Bosch was relegated to the Eerste Divisie again, following that some of their key players; Koen van de Laak, Mourad Mghizrat, Jochen Janssen and Dennis Schulp left the club, making Powel the most important player of the club.

After 26 games and 19 goals in the 2005–06 season, he moved to Millwall to become a more complete player. In his first game for Millwall, he scored a goal after only two minutes, giving Millwall a draw against Cardiff City. After Millwall were relegated to Football League One, he moved to De Graafschap where he signed a contract for three seasons. Playing for the Doetinchem side, he had an important role during the first half of his first season, scoring 29 goals and becoming the topscorer of Eerste Divisie.

On 25 August 2010, Powel was signed by Spanish club Gimnàstic de Tarragona, currently playing in the Spanish Second Division, on a free transfer. On 4 September he scored two goals in his first game against Girona FC. The game ended 2–0. Although his performance in training sessions was impressive, he failed to score in the next four matches, which ended in four goalless defeats for Gimnàstic. After he was advised by the technical team not to play as a reference striker but as a more mobile player up front, he displayed another impressive performance in the Cartagena v Gimnàstic game. The Spanish team was losing 1–0 when he entered the pitch, and thanks to a goal by Powel, Gimnástic eventually led 2–1 before receiving a late goal (2–2). Powel did not score his fourth goal of the season until six games later, at Alcorcón, a penalty shot in the 68th minute that gave Gimnàstic a point. Powel kept on being top scorer at Gimnàstic although he had not scored for four and six games in a row (spaces between second and third goal, and third and fourth). After the sacking of manager Luis César Sampedro the situation changed for Gimnàstic and for Berry altogether. With new manager Juan Carlos Oliva, Gimnàstic reached places out of the relegation zone and Berry scored in four matches in a row (against Salamanca, Rayo Vallecano, Celta and Xerez). Powel established himself as a hero for many Gimnàstic supporters and local media gave him the nickname "The Killer of Utrecht".

After one and a half seasons, Powel's contract with Nàstic was rescinded, when he was seen in a club days after undergoing an operation for a muscular injury.

On 5 June 2012, Powel signed a two-year contract with Elche CF. After promoting to La Liga, Powel left Elche on a free transfer in August 2013. After being on trial with De Graafschap, Powel signed an amateur deal with Eredivisie side Heracles Almelo. However, only six weeks later and having made four appearances for the club, Powel left Heracles as he could sign a professional contract with Roda JC Kerkrade until the end of the season.

Later career
On 26 April 2019, it was confirmed that Powel would work in the scouting area at De Graafschap from 1 July 2019. In August 2019, Powel also joined Tweede Divisie club GVVV.

References

External links
 
 
 

1980 births
Living people
Footballers from Utrecht (city)
Dutch footballers
Association football forwards
Eredivisie players
Eerste Divisie players
Derde Divisie players
Tweede Divisie players
FC Den Bosch players
De Graafschap players
FC Groningen players
ADO Den Haag players
Heracles Almelo players
Roda JC Kerkrade players
English Football League players
Millwall F.C. players
Segunda División players
Gimnàstic de Tarragona footballers
Huracán Valencia CF players
Elche CF players
Kozakken Boys players
IJsselmeervogels players
GVVV players
Dutch expatriate footballers
Dutch expatriate sportspeople in England
Dutch expatriate sportspeople in Spain
Expatriate footballers in England
Expatriate footballers in Spain